Kees de Kort (2 December 1934, Nijkerk - 19 August 2022) was a Dutch artist best known for his illustrations of Bible scenes for children's books.

Life
De Kort studied at the Art Academy of Amersfoort, at the Art School of Utrecht and at the Imperial Academy of Fine Arts in Amsterdam.

De Kort first created Bible illustrations for the public television station "schulfunk".  In 1965 the Dutch Bible Society commissioned him to illustrate a number of biblical stories for people with learning disabilities. This led in 1967 to the series called What the Bible says - a series of small picture books, each containing one Bible story. The text was written in simple words, always limited to a few short sentences per page. De Kort developed a distinctive pictorial style for his illustrations, with vivid characters and bright colors. It is said that his pictures appeal to both children and adults, without slipping into kitsch.

The Bible books were published in 65 countries and translated into many languages.

In 1992, De Kort compiled these books into a larger work, the Kijkbijbel ("Look-Bible"), which has been published in translation under several titles.

De Kort also drew illustrations of Bible stories for adults (the subjects include the Book of Amos, the Book of Job and the Song of Songs). He also has created stained glass windows and triptychs with religious subjects.

De Kort lived in Bergen, North Holland, was married, and has two sons who are also artists.

Works

What the Bible Tells Us
The following titles comprise the "What the Bible Tells Us" series, published by The Bible Societies in the U.K. and by the Augsburg Publishing House in the U.S.:

Old Testament stories:
 In the Beginning
 Noah
 Abraham
 Jacob and Esau
 Joseph
 Moses
 On the Way to the Promised Land
 Ruth
 David
 Jonah

New Testament stories:
 A Baby Called John
 Jesus is Born
 Jesus Goes to Jerusalem (the twelve-year-old Jesus)
 Jesus at the Wedding
 Jesus and His Disciples (first encounters with the disciples)
 Jesus Heals a Sick Man
 Jesus and the Storm
 Jesus Conquers Death
 Jesus and a Little Girl
 Jesus Heals a Blind Man (Bartimaeus)
 Zacchaeus
 The Good Samaritan
 The Son Who Left Home
 The Workers in the Vineyard
 Jesus at the Passover (Jesus enters Jerusalem, the Last Supper)
 Jesus is Alive (aka: Jesus is Risen; Gethsemane, Pilate, the crucifixion, the empty tomb, first resurrection appearances)
 Jesus Goes Away (the ascension, Pentecost)
 A Man is Baptized (the first gentile convert)

Other books
 Kees de Kort, Kijkbijbel ("Look-Bible"), Haarlem: Bijbelgenootschap, 1992
 Das grosse Bibel-Bilderbuch, Gemalt von Kees de Kort ("The Big Bible Picture-Book, Painted by Kees de Kort"), Stuttgart, Deutsche Bibelgesellschaft, 1998
 Imgard Weth, The Neukirchen Children's Bible, illustrated by Kees de Kort
 Imgard Weth, 7 x 7 Bible Stories (an abridgement of the Neukirchen Children's Bible)
 Imgard Weth, The New Illustrated Children's Bible, Edinburgh, Saint Andrew Press, 2008 (another translation of 7 x 7 Bible Stories)

References

External links
 website of Kees de Kort

1934 births
2022 deaths
Dutch artists
Dutch illustrators
People from Nijkerk